Tonje Nøstvold (born 7 May 1985) is a Norwegian handball player. She currently plays for Sola HK. Previous clubs includes Byåsen HE and FC Midtjylland Håndbold.

She made her debut on the Norwegian national team in 2005, and has played 183 matches and scored 408 goals. She was part of the Olympic gold medal-winning teams of 2008 and 2012, the World Championship winning team of 2011 and the European championship winning teams in 2006, 2008 and 2010.

References

External links

1985 births
Living people
Norwegian expatriate sportspeople in Denmark
Norwegian female handball players
Expatriate handball players
Handball players at the 2008 Summer Olympics
Olympic handball players of Norway
Olympic gold medalists for Norway
Olympic medalists in handball
Handball players at the 2012 Summer Olympics
Medalists at the 2012 Summer Olympics
Medalists at the 2008 Summer Olympics
Sportspeople from Stavanger
21st-century Norwegian women